Gavak, also known as Bosiken (Boskien) and Dimir, is a Papuan language of Madang Province, Papua New Guinea. It is spoken in the Dimir River area.

References

Dimir–Malas languages
Languages of Madang Province